Harmostes dorsalis is a species of scentless plant bug in the family Rhopalidae. It is found in Central America, North America, and South America.

References

Articles created by Qbugbot
Insects described in 1835
Rhopalinae
Hemiptera of North America
Hemiptera of Central America
Hemiptera of South America